Darrin Plab (born September 26, 1970) is a retired American high jumper. Born in Belleville, Illinois, he competed at the 1992 Olympic Games without reaching the final.

Plab attended Mascoutah High School and Southern Illinois University Carbondale. His personal best jump is 2.35 metres, achieved in June 1992 in New Orleans.

References
 

1970 births
Living people
American male high jumpers
Athletes (track and field) at the 1992 Summer Olympics
Olympic track and field athletes of the United States
Southern Illinois Salukis men's track and field athletes
Sportspeople from Belleville, Illinois
Track and field athletes from Illinois